was a Japanese actor who specialized in playing villains and tough guys. In 1957, he signed a contract with Toei Studio and appeared in over 1000 films. He won the Best Supporting Actor award at the Yokohama Film Festival for his role in Shinde mo ii.

Selected filmography

Film

1953: Daibosatsu Tôge - Dai-ni-bu: Mibu to Shimabara no maki; Miwa kamisugi no maki - Takagawa
1960: Bôso omote he derô
1961: Hachi-nin me no teki
1961: Shin jinsei gekijô
1962: Ankoku-gai saigo no hi
1962: Nerai uchi no buraikan
1963: Tokubetsu kidô sôsatai
1963: Tokubetsu kidô sôsatai: Tokyo eki ni harikome
1963: Ankokugai saidai no kettô - Ishigami
1963: Asakusa no kyôkaku
1963: Showa kyokyaku den
1963: Yakuza no uta
1963: Tôkyô gyangu tai Honkon gyangu
1964: Wolves, Pigs and Men - Mizuhara
1964: Doro inu
1965: A Fugitive from the Past - Pressman
1965: Himo
1965: Kuroi neko - Sagawa
1965: Nippon dorobô monogatari - Saiki, News reporter
1965: Zoku Abashiri bangaichi
1965: Shôwa zankyô-den - Yakuza
1965: Gyangu chôjô sakusen - Chin
1966: Shôwa zankyô-den: Karajishi botan
1966: Odoshi - Sabu
1966: Otoko no shôbu
1966: Kaitei daisensô - Henchman
1966: Ninkyô yawara ichidai
1966: Umi no koto - Guest
1966: Otoko dokyô de shobû
1966: Kamikaze Man: Duel at Noon - detective
1966: Rampaging Dragon of the North - Gen Ashida
1967: Ceremony of Disbanding - Nakanishi
1967: Soshiki bôryoku
1967: Kawachi yûkyôden - Sutezo
1967: Zoku soshiki bôryoku - Detective Sawai
1967: Choueki juhachi-nen: kari shutsugoku
1968: Rikugun chôhô 33 - Oku
1968: Kaidan hebi-onna - Saiji
1968: Uragiri no ankokugai - Barman
1968: Blackmail Is My Life - Seki
1968: Gokuchu no kaoyaku
1968: Gambler's Farewell
1968: Ah, yokaren - Teacher
1969: Black Rose Mansion - Kyohei's son - Wataru's brother
1969: Japan Organized Crime Boss
1970: Tora! Tora! Tora! - Japanese Pilot (uncredited)
1972: Street Mobster - Miyahara
1972: Female Prisoner 701: Scorpion - Okizaki
1972: Wandering Ginza Butterfly 2: She-Cat Gambler - Tadokoro
1972: Female Convict Scorpion: Jailhouse 41 - Okizaki
1972: Outlaw Killers: Three Mad Dog Brothers
1973: Battles Without Honor and Humanity: Deadly Fight in Hiroshima - Keisuke Nakahara
1973: Hissatsu Shikakenin - Matajûrô Mineyama
1973: Battles Without Honor and Humanity: Proxy War - Hideo Hayakawa
1973: Karate Kiba - Hijacker A
1973: Bodigaado Kiba: Hissatsu sankaku tobi - Tatsumi Masaru
1974: Battles Without Honor and Humanity: Police Tactics
1974: Zero Woman: Red Handcuffs - Masashi Kusaka
1974: Executioner - Boss
1974: Sister Street Fighter: Hanging by a Thread - Kazushige Osone
1974: New Battles Without Honor and Humanity - Masuo Nozaki
1974: Battles Without Honor and Humanity: Police Tactics - Hideo Hayakawa
1975: Graveyard of Honor - Yasuo Matsuoka
1975: Cops vs. Thugs - Tsukahara
1975: Gambling Den Heist - Kumakichi
1975: Cross the Rubicon! 
1975: Champion of Death
1975: New Battles Without Honor and Humanity: The Boss's Head - Takeo Akamatsu
1976: Violent Panic: The Big Crash
1976: Karate Warriors
1976: Yakuza Graveyard - Hidaka
1976: The Classroom of Terror
1976: Yakuza Graveyard
1977: Karate for Life
1977: Doberman Cop - Jiro Takahashi
1977: Proof of the Man - Detective at Yokota
1978: Shogun's Samurai - Sagenta Nogero (Leader of Negoro Clan)
1978: Talk of the Town Tora-san - Soeda
1979: Hunter in the Dark - Hino
1980: Kagemusha - Nobufusa Baba
1980: The Beast to Die - Hideyuki Kashiwagi
1981: Samurai Reincarnation - Priest Inshun Hozoin
1981: Station - Shigeru Morioka
1982: Onimasa - Sagara
1982: The Go Masters
1982: Theater of Life 
1983: Merry Christmas, Mr. Lawrence - New Commandant of Camp
1983: The Go Masters
1985: Seburi monogatari - Kuzushiri
1986: Minami e Hashire, Umi no Michi o! - Kazuyuki Kiryu
1986: Tokei – Adieu l'hiver
1987: A Taxing Woman - Jūkichi Ishii
1987: Sure Death 4: Revenge - Yahei Hirano
1987: Kyofu-no yacchan - Sentaro Jinnai
1987: Abunai deka
1990: Heaven and Earth - Obu Masatora
1990: Ready to Shoot
1991: Hiruko the Goblin - Watanabe
1992: Original Sin - Hideki Tsuchiya
1993: The City That Never Sleeps: Shinjuku Shark - Momoi
1995: Gonin - Shikine
2000: Isola: Tajuu jinkaku shôjo - Old victim of the Great Hanshin Earthquake
2002: Women in the Mirror - Goda

Television
Shin Seven Color Mask (1960)
National Kid (1960)
Key Hunter (1968-73) (26 appearances as a guest star)
Hissatsu Shikakenin (1972) (ep. 1)
G-Men '75 (1975) (ep. 1 and 8)
Zenryaku Ofukurosama (1975-77)
Ōgon no Hibi (1978) as Hachisuka Masakatsu
Taiyō ni Hoero! (1986) (ep. 696)
Abunai Deka (1986) (ep. 50)
Hōjō Tokimune (2001) as Hattori Masaemon

References

External links

Hideo Murota at Kinenote

1937 births
2002 deaths
Japanese male actors
People from Otaru